Geoconda Navarrete Arratia (born 8 September 1969) is a Chilean politician who was elected as a member of the Chilean Constitutional Convention on behalf of the 27th district.

Before being elected to the Constitutional Convention, she served as the Intendant of Aysén Region.

References

External links
 

Living people
1969 births
Members of the Chilean Constitutional Convention
Intendants of Aysén Region
21st-century Chilean politicians
University of Concepción alumni
Pontifical Catholic University of Chile alumni
Pontifical Catholic University of Valparaíso alumni
University of Chile alumni
Evópoli politicians
People from Santiago
21st-century Chilean women politicians